Nana Addo Dankwa Akufo-Addo (born 29 March 1944) is a Ghanaian politician who has served as the president of Ghana since 7 January 2017. In 2020, he was re-elected for his second term, which will end on 6 January 2025. Akufo-Addo previously served as Attorney General from 2001 to 2003 and as Minister for Foreign Affairs from 2003 to 2007 under the Kufuor-led administration. He was elected as the Economic Community of West African States (ECOWAS) chairman on 7 September 2020. He was re-elected for a second term as the Economic Community of West African States (ECOWAS) Chairman on 2 February 2021. He ended his term  on 3 July 2022.  

Akufo-Addo first ran for president in 2008 and again in 2012, both times as the candidate of the New Patriotic Party (NPP). He lost on both occasions to National Democratic Congress' candidates: John Evans Atta Mills in 2008 and John Dramani Mahama in 2012. After the 2012 general elections, he refused to concede and proceeded to court to challenge the electoral results, but the Supreme Court of Ghana affirmed Mahama's victory.

He was chosen as the presidential candidate of the New Patriotic Party for a third time for the 2016 general elections, and this time, he defeated incumbent Mahama in the first round (winning with 53.85% of the votes), which marked the first time in a Ghanaian presidential election that an opposition candidate won a majority outright in the first round. It was also the first time that an opposition candidate had unseated an incumbent president.

He again secured an outright majority in the first round of the 2020 general elections (winning with 51.59% of the vote), defeating Mahama a second time, and was sworn in at exactly 1:03 pm GMT on 7 January 2021.

In December 2021, Nana Akufo-Addo pledged to respect the two-term limit mandated in the Ghanaian constitution and not run for a third term in 2024.

Early life and education
Nana Addo Dankwa Akufo-Addo was born in Swalaba Accra, Ghana, on 29 March 1944, to a prominent Ghanaian royal and political family as the son of Adeline and Edward Akufo-Addo. His father Edward Akufo-Addo from Akropong-Akuapem was Ghana's third Chief Justice from 1966 to 1970, chairman of the 1967–68 Constitutional Commission and the non-executive president of Ghana from 1970 till 1972. Akufo-Addo's maternal grandfather was Nana Sir Ofori Atta, King of Akyem Abuakwa, who was a member of the executive council of the governor of the Gold Coast before Ghana's independence. He is a nephew of Kofi Asante Ofori-Atta and William Ofori Atta. His granduncle was J. B. Danquah, another member of The Big Six.

He started his primary education at the Government Boys School, Adabraka, and later went to Kinbu, in Accra Central. He went to England to study for his O-Level and A-Level examinations at Lancing College, Sussex, where he was nicknamed "Billy" and joined the Anglican faith. He began the Philosophy, Politics and Economics course at New College, Oxford, in 1962, but left soon afterwards. He returned to Ghana in 1962 to teach at the Accra Academy, before going to read economics at the University of Ghana, Legon, in 1964, earning a BSc (Econ) degree in 1967. He subsequently joined Middle Temple and trained as a lawyer under the apprenticeship system known as the Inns of Court, where no formal law degree was required. He was called to the English Bar (Middle Temple) in July 1971. He was called to the Ghanaian bar in July 1975. Akufo-Addo worked with the Paris office of the U.S. law firm Coudert Brothers. In 1979, he co-founded the law firm Prempeh and Co.

Political life
Though known by his friends to have been a vocal supporter of the Convention People's Party (CPP) while a student in the University of Ghana, he switched sides to the rival UP tradition following the overthrow of President Nkrumah in 1966 after which his father, Edward Akufo-Addo became ceremonial president of Ghana in 1969. Akufo-Addo's participation in politics formally began in the late 1970s when he joined the People's Movement for Freedom and Justice (PMFJ), an organisation formed to oppose the General Acheampong-led Supreme Military Council's Union Government proposals. In May 1995, he was among a broad group of elites who formed Alliance for Change, an alliance that organised demonstrations against neo-liberal policies such as the introduction of Value Added Tax and human rights violations of the Rawlings presidency. The forefront of this demonstration were himself, Abdul Malik Kwaku Baako and Saifullah Senior minister Victor Newman, Kwasi Pratt Jnr, Dr. Charles Wreko Brobbey among others. They were joined by about 100,000 other people. The protest was named "Kumepreko". As elite elites vied for leadership positions, the broad-based opposition alliance eventually fell apart. In the 1990s, he formed a civil rights organisation called Ghana's Committee on Human and People's Rights.

He was a member of the 2nd, 3rd and 4th parliament of the 4th republic representing the Abuakwa Constituency.

in the 1996 elections, he polled 28,526 votes out of the 50,263 valid votes cast representing 56.75% over Owuraku Amofa who polled 20,173 votes, Adoo-Aikins who polled 705 votes, Ahmadu Rufai who polled 682 votes and Emmanuel Kofi Tamakloe who polled 177 votes. He won again in the 2000 General Elections with 28,633 votes out of the 45,795 valid votes cast representing 62.50% over Christiana Annor who polled 14,486 votes, Addo-Aikins who polled 1.088 votes, Theresa Stella Amakye who polled 593 votes, Kofi Opoku-Gyamera who polled 519 votes and Isaac Duodu Awah who also polled 506 votes.

Presidential bids
In October 1998, Akufo-Addo competed for the a presidential run of the NPP and lost to John Kufuor, who subsequently won the December 2000 presidential election and assumed office as President of Ghana in January 2001. Akufo-Addo was the chief campaigner for Kufuor in the 2000 election. He became the first attorney general and Minister for justice of the Kufuor era, and later moved to the Ministry of Foreign Affairs and New Partnership for Africa's Development (NEPAD).

In 2007, he was the popular candidate tipped to win New Patriotic Party's presidential primaries. In 2008, Akufo-Addo represented NPP in a closely contested election against John Atta Mills of NDC. In the first round of voting, Akufo-Addo tallied 49.13%, leading Atta Mills with a slim margin that was below the constitutional threshold of 50% to become the outright winner.

Akufo-Addo ran again as NPP's presidential candidate in the 2012 national elections against NDC's John Mahama, successor to the late Atta Mills. Mahama was declared the winner of the election, an outcome that was legally challenged by Akufo-Addo. The court case generated considerable controversy, and was finally decided by the Ghana Supreme Court in a narrow 5/4 decision in favour of Mahama. Akufo-Addo accepted the verdict in the interest of economic stability and international goodwill.

In March 2014, Akufo-Addo announced his decision to seek his party's nomination for the third time ahead of the 2016 election. In the NPP primary conducted in October 2014, he was declared victor with 94.35% of the votes. Akufo-Addo also served as chair of the Commonwealth Observer Mission for the South African elections in 2014.

He focused his campaign on the economy, promising to stabilize the country's foreign exchange rate and to reduce unemployment levels. 
On 9 December 2016, sitting president Mahama conceded defeat to Akufo-Addo. Akufo-Addo won the election with 53.83% of the votes against Mahama's 44.4%.

Nana Addo announced his intention to run for re-election by picking a nomination form as flagbearer of the New Patriotic Party ahead of the 2020 general elections. On 9 December 2020, Nana Addo was declared the winner of the 7 December 2020 Ghana Presidential election after securing a majority of 51.59% of the vote, just enough to win re-election in a single round.

President of Ghana

Inauguration
Akufo-Addo took office on 7 January 2017. His inauguration was held at Black Star Square in Accra. Twelve presidents from African and European countries attended the ceremony, including Edgar Lungu of Zambia, Abdel Fattah el-Sisi of Egypt, Ernest Bai Koroma of Sierra Leone, Robert Mugabe of Zimbabwe, Muhammadu Buhari of Nigeria.

Akufo-Addo faced backlash, especially on social media, for plagiarising parts of his inauguration speech, having lifted passages, word-for-word, from previous inaugural addresses given by American presidents John F. Kennedy, Bill Clinton and George W. Bush as well as prepared remarks given by Nigerian President Muhammadu Buhari at a 2015 United States Institute of Peace event. After the scandal came to light, his press office issued an apology, with his communication director describing the situation as a "complete oversight and never deliberate." However, after the mea culpa, it was found that Akufo-Addo had also plagiarised portions of his 2013 concession speech after the Supreme Court of Ghana upheld the 2012 electoral victory of President John Mahama. In that speech, lines were lifted verbatim from United States Vice-president Al Gore's 2000 presidential concession speech given after the US Supreme Court verdict.

Education
In September 2017, the president launched the Free Senior High School (SHS) policy, which will make secondary high school free for students in Ghana. The president states it is a "necessary investment in the nation's future workforce" and will help parents who are unable to pay for their children's education due to financial hardships. The program met with positive reaction from the nation, parents and students were excited and fervent, but private schools opposed to the program state it will decrease the number of students enrolling in their system.

Economy
In 2018, the president introduced the 7-year Co-ordinated Programme of Economic and Social Development Policies which is expected to create jobs for the country. According to the president, the policies are founded on "five pillars of growth and development, namely revitalizing the economy; transform agriculture and industry; revamping economic and social infrastructure; strengthening social protection and inclusion; and reforming delivery system of public services institutions. Despite the IMF already warning the country that it was at high risk of debt-distress, the government of Akufo-Addo kept on borrowing, pushing up the nation's public debt from 56% of GDP to 63% before the pandemic. After the pandemic, Ghana borrowed even more in comparison with its neighbours, precipitating a budget-deficit crisis, the second highest in Sub Saharan Africa at 16% as of 2020, far above the regional average of 6%.

LGBT rights

Akufo-Addo has taken a relatively moderate line on LGBT rights in Ghana. In November 2017, he suggested that the legalisation of homosexuality is inevitable and said he can foresee a change in the law. Akufo-Addo, who spent much of his early life in England, said that LGBT rights will evolve in Ghana as they have in the United Kingdom. However, he affirmed that LGBT rights were not part of the government agenda at the moment. In August 2018, he reiterated that the Government of Ghana would not legalise same-sex marriage or decriminalise homosexuality under his leadership.

Sports
In February 2019, Akufo-Addo's administration announced a complete renovation of sports buildings around Ghana due to the country hosting the Africa Games in 2023. Buildings include Accra and Cape Coast Sports Stadium and the Azumah Nelson Sports Complex in Kaneshie. The University of Ghana Sports Stadium whose renovations were abandoned in 2009 after former President John Kufuor left office will also proceed.

Other ventures
In 2019, the number of regions in Ghana increased from ten to sixteen under the president's administration. The new regions are Oti, Western North, North East, Ahafo (splitting from Brong), Savannah and Bono East Regions. The creation of the regions ends decades of petitions to the government calling for the development of new regions.

In 2020, he signed the UNAIDS Public Letter on People's Vaccine which was a campaign calling for accessibility of the COVID-19 vaccine to all. He joined other world leaders in the signing. He wrote "all people everywhere must have access to the vaccine when one becomes available." Concerns were raised that people in richer countries may have quicker access to the vaccine than poor countries which led to the writing of an open letter that any vaccine against the disease should be free and made available at no cost to all people. In February 2021, Ghana became the first African country to receive COVID-19 vaccines through the World Health Organization's COVAX program. The shipment consisted of 600,000 doses of the AstraZeneca vaccines.

In May 2020, he swore into office two appointed Supreme Court Judges, Issifu Omoro Tanko Amadu and Clemence Jackson Honyenuga at the Jubilee House.

Personal life

Akufo-Addo is from Akropong-Akuapem and Kyebi in the Eastern Region and both sides of his family are Presbyterian. He is married to Rebecca Akufo-Addo (née Griffiths-Randolph), the daughter of judge Jacob Hackenburg Griffiths-Randolph, the Speaker of the Parliament of Ghana during the Third Republic. Akufo-Addo had two previous wives before marrying Rebecca. Their names are Remi Fani-Kayode and Eleanor Nkansah-Gyamenah. Akufo-Addo's marriage to Remi ended with divorce after almost a decade of staying together whilst Akufo-Addo's marriage to Eleanor ended on her death.
 
Akufo-Addo has four biological daughters and one stepdaughter: Gyankroma, Edwina, Adriana, Yeboakua and Valerie. His first marriage to Remi, a Nigerian, bore him two of his daughters and his second marriage to Eleanor bore him a daughter.

Honours

Awards 
Akufo-Addo was presented with the Mother Teresa Memorial International Award for Social Justice in 2016 by the Harmony Foundation for sacrificing political ambitions for the sake of national peace and reconciliation.

In 2017, he received the National Achievement Award by the Africa-America Institute’s on behalf of the people of Ghana. The award was given to recognise Ghana as a country which represents freedom, democracy and stability in Africa.

Akufo-Addo was given an award for Exemplary Leadership in June 2018 by the Whitaker Group.
In August 2018 he received the African Port Award by The African Port Award (APA) Foundation for his projects on modernizing Ghana's ports. In September 2018, the U.S. Africa Business Centre of the United States Chamber of Commerce presented Akufo-Addo with the 2018 Outstanding Leader's Award in recognition of regional, diplomatic, and economic leadership in Africa. In October 2018, he received the 2018 Governance Leadership Award "in recognition of his commitment towards enhancing the living standards of the Ghanaians and governing the country in accordance with the rule of law".

In May 2019, the United Nations Secretary-General António Guterres named Akufo-Addo among the newly appointed SDG advocates as co-chair alongside the prime minister of Norway, Erna Solberg. The role of these advocates is to raise awareness, inspire greater ambition, and push for faster action on the Sustainable Development Goals (SDGs).

In June 2019, the Association of National Olympic Committees of Africa (ANOCA) announced it will honour Akufo-Addo with the Association of National Olympic Committees of Africa (ANOCA) Merit Award for Heads of State due to his tremendous contribution to sports development and projects in Ghana and for the successful bid for Ghana to host the 2023 African Games.

Nana Akufo-Addo was honoured at the fourth Ghana Hotels Association Awards, held on 20 January 2020, for demonstrating visionary leadership by declaring the year of return and ensuring its successful execution.

On 10th October 2022, the University of Sorbonne in Paris, France presented a honorary doctorate degree to Akufo-Addo.

Foreign honours
:
 Member of the Order of Excellence (11 June 2019)
:
 Grand Cross of the National Order of the Ivory Coast (5 May 2017) 
:
 Grand Cordon of the Order of the Pioneers of Liberia (27 May 2017)
:
 Collar of the Order of Muhammad (17 February 2017)
:
 Grand Cross of the National Order of the Lion (16 May 2017)
:
 Order of the Republic of Serbia, Second Class (10 October 2021)

See also
 Cabinet of Akufo-Addo government

References

External links

 MyGHPage: Nana Addo Dankwa Akufo-Addo Biography.
 GhanaWeb: Nana Addo Dankwa Akufo-Addo biography.
 EIN News: Nana Addo Dankwa Akufo-Addo
 Ghpage: Nana Addo Dankwa Akuffo Addo family and biography

|-

|-

|-

|-

|-

.

1944 births
Akan people
Attorneys General of Ghana
Children of national leaders
Foreign ministers of Ghana
Ghanaian MPs 1997–2001
Ghanaian MPs 2001–2005
Ghanaian MPs 2005–2009
20th-century Ghanaian lawyers
Justice ministers of Ghana
Living people
Members of the Middle Temple
New Patriotic Party politicians
Ofori-Atta family
People educated at Lancing College
Presidents of Ghana
University of Ghana alumni
People from Eastern Region (Ghana)
Ghanaian Anglicans
Former Presbyterians
Converts to Anglicanism from Calvinism
Recipients of orders, decorations, and medals of Senegal